The Space Between is a 2017 Canadian film written and directed by Amy Jo Johnson. It stars Amy Jo Johnson, Jayne Eastwood, Michael Ironside, Sonya Salomaa, Michael Cram and Julia Sarah Stone.

Premise
When a man discovers that his child is not his, he goes looking for answers.

Cast
 Amy Jo Johnson as Amelia
 Jayne Eastwood as Luella
 Michael Ironside as Nick
 Sonya Salomaa as Jackie
 Michael Cram as Mitch
 Julian Richings as Stash
 David Paetkau as Marcus
 Kristian Bruun as Teddy
 Julia Sarah Stone as Emily
 Kerri Smith as Martha

Production

Development
The movie was financed by an Indiegogo campaign.

Filming
The film was shot in Canada. Filming started and concluded in July 2015.

Soundtrack
August Cinjun Tate composed music for the film.
Additionally, a compilation album of music featured in the film was released digitally and physically by iTunes and CD Baby on October 20, 2016.

References

External links
 
 
 The Space Between on indiegogo.com

2017 films
English-language Canadian films
Films set in 2017
Canadian drama films
2017 drama films
2017 directorial debut films
2010s English-language films
2010s Canadian films